DMAP may refer to:

 Digital Media Access Protocol, a family of proprietary protocols by Apple
 4-Dimethylaminopyridine (CH3)2NC5H4N), a derivative of pyridine
 4-Dimethylaminophenol (C8H11NO), an aromatic compound containing both phenol and amine functional groups
 Data Management Advisory Panel, of the England school census

See also
 Dimethylallylpyrophosphate (DMAPP)
 Digital Mass Atrocity Prevention Lab, of the Montreal Institute for Genocide and Human Rights Studies